The Church of All Saints is a Church of England parish church in Doddinghurst, Essex. The church is a Grade I listed building.

Notable clergy
 Oswald Trellis, priest-in-charge from 2002 to 2005
Ann Coleman, priest-in-charge from 2015 to present

References

External links
 A Church Near You entry

Church of England church buildings in the Borough of Brentwood
Grade I listed churches in Essex
13th-century church buildings in England